The Gibraltar national football team is the representative association football team of Gibraltar, a British Overseas Territory located at the southern tip of the Iberian Peninsula. It is controlled by the Gibraltar Football Association (GFA), the governing body of the sport there. It competes as a member of the Union of European Football Associations (UEFA) and the International Federation of Association Football (FIFA). They first applied for UEFA membership in 1997 which was rejected, as UEFA would only allow membership for applicants recognised as sovereign states by the United Nations. In October 2012, Gibraltar reapplied for membership and it was granted in March 2013. Gibraltar played their first official international fixture on 13 November 2013, a 0–0 draw with Slovakia in the Estádio Algarve, Portugal.

As of 19 November 2022, Gibraltar have played 74 matches, winning 8, drawing 9 and losing 57. Gibraltar have played more matches against Georgia and Liechtenstein than any other international side, with six meetings between the teams. In global and continental competitions, the team has competed in qualification groups for both the FIFA World Cup since 2018, and the UEFA European Championship since 2016; but have failed to qualify for any tournament finals. They have competed in the UEFA Nations League since the inaugural season in 2018–19.

Midfielder Liam Walker is the nation's most capped player, accumulating 67 appearances since his international debut in November 2013 against Slovakia. Roy Chipolina and Liam Walker are the nation's leading goalscorers of all time with five goals each. Dayle Coleing and Kyle Goldwin are the most capped goalkeeper in Gibraltar's history having appeared 21 times each for the national side. Defender Joseph Chipolina has received the most yellow cards (cautions), with eleven. Defender Jayce Olivero has received the most red cards (dismissals), with two sending off. Since their official debut in 2013, 65 players have made at least one international appearance for Gibraltar.

Players
Appearances and goals are composed of UEFA Nations League, UEFA European Championship qualification, FIFA World Cup qualification, and international friendly matches. Players are listed by number of caps, then number of goals scored. If number of caps and goals are equal, the players are then listed alphabetically. Statistics correct as of match played on 19 November 2022.

See also
 Gibraltar national football team records and statistics

References

External links

 Official website of GFA
 Profile at national-football-teams.com
 List of players at eu-football.info

 
Association football player non-biographical articles